Eliška Drahotová (born 22 July 1995, Rumburk, Czech Republic) is a Czech athletics competitor in racewalking and road cycling, like her twin sister, Anežka. She won the bronze medal in the 2013 European Athletics Junior Championships, while her twin sister Anežka Drahotová took the gold. Her global debut in cycling also came that year at the 2013 UCI Road World Championships. There she placed 34th in the junior time trial.

She also competes in the running events: half-marathon, 3000 m, 2000 m, 1500 m, 800m, as well as in on other racewalking distances, including the 20 km walk.

References

External links 

 

Czech female racewalkers
1995 births
Living people
Twin sportspeople
Czech twins
People from Rumburk
Czech female cyclists
Sportspeople from the Ústí nad Labem Region